Ngunnawal/Ngunawal is an  Australian Aboriginal language, the traditional language of the Ngunnawal. Ngunnawal is very closely related to the Gandangara language and the two were most likely highly mutually intelligible. As such they can be considered dialects of a single unnamed language, but this is the technical linguistic usage of these terms and Ngunnawal people prefer to describe their variety as a language in its own right, as also do the Gandangara.

Classification
Gundungurra/Ngunawal is generally classified to fall within the tentative (and perhaps geographic) Yuin–Kuric group of the Pama–Nyungan family.

Location
The traditional country of the Ngunnawal is generally thought to have extended from near Goulburn, west to Boorowa, south through Canberra, perhaps to Queanbeyan, and extending west to around the Goodradigbee River.

Sounds

Ngunawal vowels

Current status
The Ngunnawal community has for some years been engaged in work to revive the language with the aim being to bring it back into daily use within the community. They have been working with AIATSIS linguists to assist them with this work, and with identifying historical records that can be used for this work.

Ngunawal words 

More words are compiled online in The Wiradyuri and Other Languages of New South Wales, an article by Robert H. Mathews first published in the Journal of the Royal Anthropological Institute in 1904.

References

 

Yuin–Kuric languages
Canberra
Extinct languages of Australian Capital Territory
Extinct languages of New South Wales
https://aiatsis.gov.au/research/research-themes/ngunawal-language-revival-project